The Roman Catholic Diocese of Aliwal is a diocese located in the city of Aliwal North (Joe Gqabi District Municipality) in the Ecclesiastical province of Eastern Cape in South Africa.

History
 June 12, 1923: Established as Apostolic Prefecture of Gariep from the Apostolic Vicariate of Cape of Good Hope, Eastern District
 January 27, 1936: Promoted as Apostolic Vicariate of Aliwal
 January 11, 1951: Promoted as Diocese of Aliwal

Special churches
 The cathedral is named Sacred Heart Cathedral situated on the corner of Cathcart and Young Streets in Aliwal North.

Leadership
Prefect Apostolic of Gariep
 Fr. Franz Wolfgang Demont, S.C.I. (27 July 1923 – 27 January 1936 see below)
Vicars Apostolic of Aliwal
 Franz Wolfgang Demont, S.C.I. (see above 27 January 1936 – 3 February 1944)
 Johannes Baptist Lück, S.C.I. (13 March 1947 – 11 January 1951 see below)
Bishops of Aliwal
 Johannes Baptist Lück, S.C.I. (see above 11 January 1951 – 17 December 1973)
 Everardus Antonius M. Baaij, S.C.I. (17 December 1973 – 30 October 1981)
 Fritz Lobinger (18 November 1987 – 29 April 2004)
 Michael Wuestenberg (24 February 2008 – 1 September 2017)
 Joseph Kizito (15 November 2019 – present)

See also
Roman Catholicism in South Africa

References

External links
 Official website 
 GCatholic.org
 Catholic Hierarchy

Roman Catholic dioceses in South Africa
Christian organizations established in 1923
Roman Catholic dioceses and prelatures established in the 20th century
Roman Catholic Ecclesiastical Province of Cape Town